The 1964 Chicago White Sox season was the team's 64th season in the major leagues, and its 65th season overall. They finished with a record of 98–64, good enough for second place in the American League, just one game behind the first-place New York Yankees.

Offseason 
 December 2, 1963: Rudy May was drafted by the White Sox from the Minnesota Twins in the 1963 first-year draft.
 February 25, 1964: Jim Brosnan was released by the White Sox.
 March 18, 1964: Don Mossi was purchased by the White Sox from the Detroit Tigers.

Regular season

Notable transactions 
 April 8, 1964: Minnie Miñoso was signed as a free agent by the White Sox.
 April 23, 1964: Charley Smith was traded by the White Sox to the New York Mets for Chico Fernández, Bobby Catton (minors), and cash.
 July 13, 1964: Joe Cunningham and a player to be named later were traded by the White Sox to the Washington Senators for Bill Skowron and Carl Bouldin. The White Sox completed the deal by sending Frank Kreutzer to the Senators on July 28.
 July 17, 1964: Minnie Miñoso was released by the White Sox.

Opening Day lineup 
 Jim Landis, CF
 Don Buford, 2B
 Floyd Robinson, RF
 Dave Nicholson, LF
 Joe Cunningham, 1B
 Ron Hansen, SS
 Charley Smith, 3B
 J. C. Martin, C
 Gary Peters, P

Season standings

Record vs. opponents

Roster

Player stats

Batting 
Note: G = Games played; AB = At bats; R = Runs scored; H = Hits; 2B = Doubles; 3B = Triples; HR = Home runs; RBI = Runs batted in; BB = Base on balls; SO = Strikeouts; AVG = Batting average; SB = Stolen bases

Pitching 
Note: W = Wins; L = Losses; ERA = Earned run average; G = Games pitched; GS = Games started; SV = Saves; IP = Innings pitched; H = Hits allowed; R = Runs allowed; ER = Earned runs allowed; HR = Home runs allowed; BB = Walks allowed; K = Strikeouts

Farm system 

LEAGUE CHAMPIONS: Lynchburg

Notes

References 
 1964 Chicago White Sox at Baseball Reference

Chicago White Sox seasons
Chicago White Sox season
Chicago